The Lazio regional election of 2010 took place in Lazio, Italy, on 28–29 March 2010.

Piero Marrazzo of the Democratic Party (PD), who was elected President in 2005, seemed a strong candidate for the centre-left in 2010, being the most popular of the possible candidates and the winner in most head-to-head contests with leading centre-right figures. However, an abrupt scandal invested him in October 2009 and finally led to his dramatic resignation.

After that, the candidate of The People of Freedom (PdL) seemed a shoo-in for victory. As Lazio had been a traditional stronghold of Fini's National Alliance party, that merged into the PdL as junior partner of Berlusconi's Forza Italia in 2007, Renata Polverini, supported by Gianfranco Fini, was chosen. Polverini, a woman, was a strange choice for a centre-right party as she was the respected leader of the General Labour Union (UGL), a trade union close to the former National Alliance but independent from it, and a self-proclaimed "socialist", so that she was praised by left-wingers, including the popular newspaper Il Fatto Quotidiano, and criticized by a right-wing newspaper, Il Giornale, that refused to endorse her.

After that, the list of the PdL was disqualified from participating in the election in the Province of Rome, that accounted for four-fifths of the total electorate of Lazio, the election was fairly uncertain, with Bonino in the lead according to some opinion polls.

Despite this, on election day, Polverini beat Bonino in hard-fought battle thanks to a 3.7% swing.

Results

References

Elections in Lazio
2010 elections in Italy
March 2010 events in Italy